Diane, Dowager Duchess of Württemberg (née Princess Diane Françoise Maria da Gloria of Orléans; born 24 March 1940) is a French-German painter, sculptor, writer and philanthropist. She was the wife of Carl, Duke of Württemberg, head of the House of Württemberg. She is the fourth daughter and sixth child of Henri, Count of Paris, Orléanist pretender to the throne of France, and his wife, Princess Isabelle of Orléans-Braganza.

Early life
Princess Diane was born in Petrópolis, Brazil, the fourth daughter and sixth child of the Orléanist claimant to the French throne, Henri, Count of Paris, and his wife, Princess Isabelle of Orléans-Braganza. At the time of her birth, as a claimant to the throne, her father was banned from living in France. Thus, she was born in her mother's native Brazil. In 1950, the ban was lifted and the family moved to France. Princess Diane attended the Académie Julian in Paris.

Career and patronages

The Duchess became interested in silk painting at the age of 14. She received formal training at the Académie Julian. She worked in a variety of techniques such as silk screen printing, oil painting, stuccowork, glass and wood painting. In 1971, following an illness caused by using lead-based paints, Diane began sculpting.  She signs her works as DxDiane. The letter D placed before Diane signifies Dimanche de Pâques, the day of her birth. She is a patron of the Smolny Institute of Liberal Arts and Science.

In 1979, the Duchess established an eponymous foundation, "Diane Herzogin von Württemberg, Prinzessin von Frankreich-Stiftung," to aid disadvantaged children.

Marriage and issue
In 1956, on a cruise organized by Queen Frederica of Greece, Princess Diane met Duke Carl of Württemberg, son and heir of Philipp Albrecht, Duke of Württemberg and his wife, Archduchess Rosa of Austria. In 1957, her brother, Prince Henri, married Carl's sister, Duchess Marie-Thérèse of Württemberg.

On 21 July 1960, she married Duke Carl at Altshausen. The wedding celebrations lasted three days. Princess Diane wore a Dior gown designed by Yves Saint Laurent.

In 1975, Carl succeeded his father as head of the House of Württemberg.

They have six children and sixteen grandchildren: 
 Friedrich Philipp Carl Franz Maria, Hereditary Duke of Württemberg (Friedrichshafen, 1 June 1961 – near Ebenweiler, 9 May 2018). He married in Altshausen on 11 November 1993 to Princess Wilhelmine Friederike Pauline Elisabeth Marie of Wied (born Munich, 27 December 1973), with issue: 
 Wilhelm Friedrich Carl Philipp Albert Nikolaus Erich Maria, Duke of Württemberg (Ravensburg, 13 August 1994), succeeded his grandfather as head of the House of Württemberg in 2022
 Duchess Marie Amélie Diane Katharina Beatrix Philippa Sophie (Ravensburg, 12 March 1996). She engaged to Baron Franz-Ferdinand von Feilitzsch
 Duchess Sophie Dorothée Martina Johanna Henriette Charitas Maria (Ravensburg, 19 August 1997)
 Duchess Mathilde Marie-Antoinette Rosa Isabelle (b. Friedrichshafen, 11 July 1962). She married in 1988 to Prince Erich of Waldburg zu Zeil und Trauchburg (b. 1962), with issue.
 Duke Eberhard Alois Nikolaus Heinrich Johannes Maria (b. Friedrichshafen, 20 June 1963). He married in 2011 (divorced in 2016) to Lucia Desiree Copf (b. Samedan, 29 December 1969), with issue.
 Duke Philipp Albrecht Christoph Ulrich Maria (b. Friedrichshafen, 1 November 1964). He married in 1991 to Duchess Marie-Caroline in Bavaria, with issue.
 Duke Michael Heinrich Albert Alexander Maria (b. Friedrichshafen, 1 December 1965). He married in 2006 to Julia Ricarda Storz (b. Munich, 4 April 1965), without issue.
 Duchess Eleonore Fleur Juanita Charlotte Eudoxie Marie-Agnès (b. Altshausen, 4 November 1977). She married in 2003 to Count Moritz von Goëss (1966), with issue.

Honours
  Sovereign Military Order of Malta: Grand Cross of the Order pro Merito Melitensi, 2000 
  France: Chevalier of the Legion of Honour, 2010
  Baden-Württemberg: Recipient of the Order of Merit of Baden-Württemberg, 2011

Awards
 Prix Européen de la Culture, 1999
 "DODO" Prize for Women, 2003
 Montblanc de la Culture Arts Patronage Award, 2005
 Honorary Doctorate, Saint Petersburg State University, 2010

Works
I.K.H. Diane Herzogin von Württemberg, Prinzessin von Frankreich ; Diane Herzogin von Württemberg, Roger Orlik ; Sp-Verlag (2002) 
Kunsthandwerk, Gemälde, Skulpturen ; Diane von Württemberg ; Ulm : Süddt. Verl.-Ges., 1991.

Ancestors

References

External links

Personal website

Living people
1940 births
French princesses
Princesses of France (Orléans)
Duchesses of Württemberg
German sculptors
20th-century German painters
German women writers
German philanthropists
German women philanthropists
German Roman Catholics
People from Petrópolis
Chevaliers of the Légion d'honneur
Recipients of the Order pro Merito Melitensi
Recipients of the Order of Merit of Baden-Württemberg
21st-century German painters